The 1910 Cork Senior Hurling Championship was the 23rd staging of the Cork Senior Hurling Championship since its establishment by the Cork County Board in 1887. The draw for the opening round fixtures took place in February 1910. The championship began on 3 April 1910 and ended on 7 August 1910.

Dungourney were the defending champions.

On 7 August 1910, Blackrock won the championship following a 6-03 to 3-01 defeat of Dungourney in the final. This was their 11th championship title overall and their first title in two championship seasons.

Results

Quarter-finals

Semi-finals

Final

References

Cork Senior Hurling Championship
Cork Senior Hurling Championship